The Mad Songs of Fernanda Hussein is a 2001 American film written and directed by John Gianvito.

Cast
Bonnie Chavez - Police Dispatcher
Sherri Goen
Thia Gonzalez	
Cliff Gravel - The Veteran
Carlos Moreno Jr. - Mike
Robert Perrea	
Elizabeth Pilar	
Dustin Scott
Carlos Stevens
Bill Facker

Awards
At the 2001 Buenos Aires International Festival of Independent Cinema, John Giavito won a Special Award for his work on the film. The film was also nominated for Best Film. At the 2001 Thessaloniki Film Festival, the film was nominated for a Golden Alexander.

Reception
The film has a critic rating of 40% on Rotten Tomatoes.

References

External links
 http://www.sensesofcinema.com/2002/feature-articles/gulf_war
 http://www.jonathanrosenbaum.net/?p=23062
 https://web.archive.org/web/20090406025119/http://movies.nytimes.com/movie/244128/The-Mad-Songs-of-Fernanda-Hussein/overview
 http://www.filmthreat.com/reviews/1850/
 http://www.vertigomagazine.co.uk/showarticle.php?sel=bac&siz=1&id=585
 http://www.filmfestivalrotterdam.com/en/films/the-mad-songs-of-fernanda-hussein
 http://www.metacritic.com/movie/the-mad-songs-of-fernanda-hussein

2001 films
2000s English-language films